Sergio Rivero (born 6 December 1963) is a Bolivian footballer. He played in nine matches for the Bolivia national football team from 1991 to 1993. He was also part of Bolivia's squad for the 1991 Copa América tournament.

References

External links
 

1963 births
Living people
Bolivian footballers
Bolivia international footballers
Association football defenders
Sportspeople from Santa Cruz de la Sierra